Kadayam was former state assembly constituency in Tenkasi district, Tamil Nadu, India. It exists from 1957 to 1962.

Members of Legislative Assembly

Election results

1962

1957

References

External links
 

Tenkasi district
Former assembly constituencies of Tamil Nadu